De la Rue or De La Rue may refer to:
 De La Rue, an English company
 De la Rue (surname) or Delarue, a surname (and a list of people with the surname)
 De La Rue (crater), a lunar crater
 De La Rue baronets, a title in the Baronetage of the United Kingdom
 Vingtaine de la Rue, a vingtaine (political subdivision) on the Channel Island of Jersey
 Thomas Delarue School, a former school in Tonbridge, Kent